A cone sheet is a type of high-level igneous intrusion of subvolcanic rock, found in partly eroded central volcanic complexes. Cone sheets are relatively thin inclined sheets, generally just a few metres thick, with the geometry of a downward-pointing cone. Viewed from above, their outcrop is typically circular to elliptical. They were originally described from the Ardnamurchan, Mull and other central complexes of the British Tertiary Volcanic Province (now recognised as part of the North Atlantic Igneous Province).

Occurrence
Cone sheets are widely distributed at the lower levels of volcanic complexes.

Formation
Soon after cone sheets were first described, their formation was explained in terms of intrusion along conical fractures extending from the top of an intrusive body into the overlying rocks, caused by high magmatic pressure.

References

Sheet intrusions